Michael McElhatton (born 12 September 1963) is an Irish actor and writer. He is best known for playing the role of Roose Bolton in the HBO series Game of Thrones. He joined the series as a guest star in the second season, and continued to play this role until the sixth season, promoted to a regular cast member from the fifth season onwards.

Life and career 
McElhatton was born on 12 September 1963 in Terenure, a suburb in the south of Dublin. He began studying acting at Terenure College, a school known for its drama tradition, and afterward spent eight years in London where he graduated from the Royal Academy of Dramatic Art in 1987. McElhatton returned to Ireland in the early nineties, where he began his acting career mainly in theatre and television. He appeared in a short film titled The Loser in 1990. In 1996, he was directed by John Carney in the film November Afternoon, in which he plays the main character. In the late nineties and early 2000s, McElhatton appeared in numerous series and TV films in Ireland, working with various film directors, including Paddy Breathnach and Conor McPherson for roles in  I Went Down  (1997), Saltwater (2000), Blow Dry (2001), and The Actors (2003). Between 2000 and 2002, McElhatton gained fame from appearing in the situation comedies Paths to Freedom and Fergus's Wedding. In addition to acting, he also took on the role of screenwriter, writing the screenplay for all of the episodes. The character of Rats in Paths to Freedom, which he wrote and starred in, became popular with the public and allowed it to be adapted into an entire feature film in 2003 (Spin the Bottle). As his career went on, McElhatton continued playing minor characters in films by directors such as Lenny Abrahamson, John Boorman and Kari Skogland. McElhatton also appeared in Perrier's Bounty (2009) and Death of a Superhero (2011).

He returned to his role as writer in 2010, writing six episodes of the sitcom Your Bad Self. Over the next decade, McElhatton began appearing in much larger roles. In 2011, he had a role in the film Albert Nobbs directed by Rodrigo García, and the following year the short Pentecost, which received a nomination for Best Short Film at the 2012 Academy Awards. That same year he took part in the film Shadow Dancer directed by James Marsh, while also on television in the cast of the miniseries Titanic: Blood and Steel.

In 2012, McElhatton joined the cast of the HBO television series Game of Thrones, beginning in the second season, playing the character of Roose Bolton. From the fifth season on he was promoted to series regular. In 2015, he played one of the protagonists in the horror film The Hallow, which was presented at the 2015 Sundance Film Festival. He appeared in the screen adaptation of the true story of World War II drama The Zookeeper's Wife in 2017.

In 2021, McElhatton appeared as Tam al'Thor in the adaptation of The Wheel of Time on Amazon Prime Video. His casting was announced on 06 November 2019 through Twitter.

Filmography

Film

Television

Video games

Writing credits 
 Paths to Freedom
 Fergus's Wedding
 Spin the Bottle
 Your Bad Self

Selected stage career
 The Night Alive, as Doc, Donmar Warehouse, London, and the Atlantic Theater, New York City
 The Seafarer, as Nicky Giblin, National Theatre, London
 Shining City, Royal Court Theatre, London
 The Wexford Trilogy, Tricycle Theatre
 An Ideal Husband, Gate Theatre
 The White Devil, Project at The Mint
 Car Show, Corn Exchange
 Twenty Grand, Abbey Theatre
 Greatest Hits, Project Arts Centre
 The Way of the World, Project Arts Centre
 A Decision Pure and Simple, Riverside Studios
 An Enemy of the People, for Young Vic
 As You Like It, Rose Theatre
 Midnight Court, Project Theatre
 Wind in the Willows, Sheffield Crucible
 Little Malcolm and His Struggle Against the Eunuchs, BAC
 Water Music, Cockpit Theatre

Awards and nominations
 2003 IFTA Award nomination, Best Actor-Film for "Spin the Bottle"
 2003 IFTA Award nomination, Best Script for "Spin the Bottle" – Ian Fitzgibbon/Michael McElhatton/Grand Pictures
 2007 IFTA Award nomination, Best Actor-Television for "Hide & Seek"
 2013 IFTA Award nomination, Best Supporting Actor-Film for "Death of a Superhero"
 20th Screen Actors Guild Awards nomination, Outstanding Performance by an Ensemble in a Drama Series

References

External links

1963 births
Living people
20th-century Irish male actors
21st-century Irish male actors
Alumni of RADA
Irish expatriates in England
Irish male film actors
Irish male Shakespearean actors
Irish male stage actors
Irish male television actors
Irish male video game actors
Irish male voice actors
Irish writers